A great hall is the main room of a royal palace, castle or a large manor house or hall house in the Middle Ages, and continued to be built in the country houses of the 16th and early 17th centuries, although by then the family used the great chamber for eating and relaxing. At that time the word "great" simply meant big and had not acquired its modern connotations of excellence. In the medieval period, the room would simply have been referred to as the "hall" unless the building also had a secondary hall, but the term "great hall" has been predominant for surviving rooms of this type for several centuries, to distinguish them from the different type of hall found in post-medieval houses.  Great halls were found especially in France, England and Scotland, but similar rooms were also found in some other European countries.

A typical great hall was a rectangular room between one and a half and three times as long as it was wide, and also higher than it was wide. It was entered through a screens passage at one end, and had windows on one of the long sides, often including a large bay window. There was often a minstrels' gallery above the screens passage. At the other end of the hall was the dais where the high table was situated. The lord's family's more private rooms lay beyond the dais end of the hall, and the kitchen, buttery and pantry were on the opposite side of the screens passage.

Even royal and noble residences had few living rooms until late in the Middle Ages, and a great hall was a multifunctional room. It was used for receiving guests and it was the place where the household would dine together, including the lord of the house, his gentleman attendants and at least some of the servants. At night some members of the household might sleep on the floor of the great hall.

Architectural detail

The hall would originally have had a central hearth, with the smoke rising through the hall to a vent in the roof, examples can be seen at Stokesay Castle and Ludlow Castle. Later chimneys were added, and it would then have one of the largest fireplaces of the palace, manor house or castle, frequently large enough to walk and stand inside.  The hearth was used for heating and also for some of the cooking, although for larger structures a medieval kitchen would customarily lie on a lower level for the bulk of the cooking.  Commonly the fireplace would have an elaborate overmantel with stone or wood carvings or even plasterwork which might contain coats of arms, heraldic mottoes (usually in Latin), caryatids or another adornment. In the upper halls of French manor houses, the fireplaces were usually very large and elaborate. Typically, the great hall had the most beautiful decorations in it, as well as on the window frame mouldings on the outer wall. Many French manor houses have very beautifully decorated external window frames on the large mullioned windows that light the hall. This decoration clearly marked the window as belonging to the lord's private hall. It was where guests slept.

In Scotland, six common furnishings were present in the sixteenth-century hall: the high table and principal seat; side tables for others; the cupboard and silver plate; the hanging chandelier, often called the 'hart-horn' made of antler; ornamental weapons, commonly a halberd; and the cloth and napery used for dining.

In western France, the early manor houses were centred on a central ground-floor hall.  Later, the hall reserved for the lord and his high-ranking guests was moved up to the first-floor level.  This was called the salle haute or upper hall (or "high room"). In some of the larger three-storey manor houses, the upper hall was as high as second storey roof. The smaller ground-floor hall or salle basse remained but was for receiving guests of any social order. It is very common to find these two halls superimposed, one on top of the other, in larger manor houses in Normandy and Brittany. Access from the ground-floor hall to the upper (great) hall was normally via an external staircase tower. The upper hall often contained the lord's bedroom and living quarters off one end.

Occasionally the great hall would have an early listening device system, allowing conversations to be heard in the lord's bedroom above.  In Scotland, these devices are called a laird's lug. In many French manor houses, there are small peep-holes from which the lord could observe what was happening in the hall. This type of hidden peep-hole is called a judas in French.

Examples

Many great halls survive. Two very large surviving royal halls are Westminster Hall, Ridderzaal in Binnenhof and the Vladislav Hall in Prague Castle (although the latter was used only for public events, never used as a great hall here described). Penshurst Place in Kent, England, has a little-altered 14th century example. Surviving 16th and early 17th century specimens in England, Wales and Scotland are numerous, for example those at Eltham Palace (England), Longleat (England), Deene Park (England), Burghley House (England), Bodysgallen Hall (Wales), Darnaway Castle (Scotland), Muchalls Castle (Scotland) and Crathes Castle (Scotland). There are numerous ruined examples, most notably the roofless hall at Linlithgow Palace (Scotland).

Survival
The domestic and monastic model applied also to Collegiate institutions during the Middle Ages. Several colleges at Cambridge and Oxford universities have medieval halls which are still used as dining rooms on a daily basis. So do the Inns of Court and the Livery Companies in London. The "high table" (often on a small dais or stage at the top of the hall, farthest away from the screens passage) seats dons (at the universities) and Masters of the Bench (at the Inns of Court), whilst students (at the universities) and barristers or students (at the Inns of Court) dine at tables placed at right angles to the high table and running down the body of the hall, thus maintaining the hierarchical arrangement of the medieval domestic, monastic or collegiate household. Numerous more recently founded schools and institutions have halls and dining halls based on medieval great halls or monastic refectories.

Decline
By the late 16th century the great hall was beginning to lose its purpose. Increasing centralization of power in royal hands meant that men of good social standing were less inclined to enter the service of a lord to obtain his protection, and so the size of the inner noble household shrank. As the social gap between master and servant grew, the family retreated, usually to the 1st floor, to private rooms. In fact, servants were not usually allowed to use the same staircases as nobles to access the great hall of larger castles in early times, and servants' staircases are still extant in places such as Muchalls Castle. Other reception and living rooms in country houses became more numerous, specialized and important, and by the late 17th century the halls of many new houses were simply vestibules, passed through to get to somewhere else, but not lived in. Several great halls like that at Great Hall in Lancashire were downsized to create two rooms.

Decline and revival
From the 15th century onwards, halls lost most of their traditional functions to more specialised rooms, first for family members and guests to the great chamber and parlours, withdrawing rooms, and later for servants who finally achieved their own servants hall to eat in and servants’ bedrooms in attics or basements). The halls of late 17th, 18th and 19th-century country houses and palaces usually functioned almost entirely as impressive entrance points to the house, and for large scale entertaining, as at Christmas, for dancing, or when a touring company of actors performed.  With the arrival of ballrooms and dedicated music rooms in the largest houses by the late 17th century, these functions too were lost. There was a revival of the great hall concept in the late 19th and early 20th centuries, with large halls used for banqueting and entertaining (but not as eating or sleeping places for servants) featuring in some houses of this period as part of a broader medieval revival, for example Thoresby Hall.

In popular culture
 In the Harry Potter franchise of books, movies, and video games, the Great Hall within Hogwarts is the site of meals, feasts, assemblies, and awards ceremonies.
 Winchester Castle's Great Hall is an important site in British history; it was the location of the trial of Walter Raleigh and partially of the Bloody Assizes and it also contains a well-preserved imitative Arthurian Round Table.

See also
Manor house
Tapestry
Mead hall
Moot hall
Hall and parlor house
Great room

Notes

External links

Architecture in the United Kingdom
Rooms
Castle architecture